Petter Thoresen (born 10 March 1966) is a Norwegian orienteering competitor, winner of the 1989 Individual World Orienteering Championships, the Short distance in 1993, and the Classic distance in 1997. He also has a bronze medal on the Classic distance from 1993.

Thoresen is two times Relay World Champion, from 1989 and 1999, as well as having a silver medal from 1991 and a bronze medal from 1997.

He represented Halden SK.

References

External links
 
 

1966 births
Living people
Norwegian orienteers
Male orienteers
Foot orienteers
World Orienteering Championships medalists